Mined-Out (also known as Minesweeper in some countries) is a video game released for the ZX Spectrum in 1983 by Quicksilva, where a player must cross a minefield successfully using logic. Although Mined-Out was not the first game in the style of Minesweeper, it was the first to be released on a home computer, and to display how many mines are adjacent to the player.

The game was written by Ian Andrew, an early adopter of the ZX81 and Spectrum. He learned to program BASIC in his spare time, and sent a copy of Mined-Out to Quicksilva after they published an advert wanting programs to publish. It received a positive reception, with Home Computing Weekly describing it as "excellent fun to play".

The game was later ported to other home computers, including the Dragon 32, BBC Micro and Acorn Electron, while Andrew founded his own company, Incentive Software.

References

External links
 
 

1983 video games
Minesweeper (video game)
BBC Micro and Acorn Electron games
ZX Spectrum games
Dragon 32 games
Video games developed in the United Kingdom
Video games about bomb disposal
Single-player video games
Quicksilva games